Fond-Zombi (or Quartier Fond Zombi) is a populated place in the arrondissement of Fort-de-France on Martinique.

References

Geography of Martinique
Populated places in Martinique